Drastea is a monotypic genus of moth in the family Acrolophidae. The genus consists of only one species, Drastea mexica, which is found in Mexico.

References

Acrolophidae
Monotypic moth genera
Moths of Central America